Scotland became part of the Kingdom of Great Britain under the Acts of Union 1707 from 1 May 1707. It became part of the United Kingdom from 1 January 1801.

Under the terms of the Act of Union 1707, Scotland was entitled to 45 members of the House of Commons of the Westminster Parliament.

A Scottish law passed before the Union defined the constituencies for elections to the Parliament of Great Britain. There was a special provision for the selection of Members of Parliament for the 1st Parliament of Great Britain.

In 1707, members of the former Parliament of Scotland were co-opted to serve in the 1st Parliament of Great Britain. See Scottish representatives to the 1st Parliament of Great Britain, for details.

Summary of constituencies and Members of Parliament
Key to categories: BC - Burgh constituencies, CC - County constituencies, UC - University constituencies, Total C - Total constituencies, BMP - Burgh Members of Parliament, CMP - County Members of Parliament, UMP - University Members of Parliament.

Constituencies in Scotland from 1707
Notes:
 Compass point and similar names for Divisions of counties often officially precede the name of the county (Central Aberdeenshire). This list uses the Burgh equivalent form (Aberdeenshire Central), for the first area included in the constituency name. This does not apply to areas where the county name is e.g. East Lothian, or the town name is e.g. East Kilbride.
 The County etc. column includes the historic/administrative county or local government region in which a constituency was included when it was created. Local government boundaries used for a redistribution were sometimes obsolete by the time the new constituencies were first used. Official names of counties did sometimes change (e.g. Edinburghshire and Midlothian). Constituencies created in 2005 have no local area mentioned. A constituency covering more than one such area has the predominant area (or for Districts of Burghs the county of the first named Burgh) recorded.

Historical representation by party
A cell marked → (with a different colour background to the preceding cell) indicates that the previous MP continued to sit under a new party name.

Highland
Before 1974 comprising the counties of Orkney, Shetland, Caithness, Sutherland, Ross-shire, Cromartyshire and Inverness-shire.

After 1996 comprising the unitary authorities of Highland, Na h-Eileanan Siar (Western Isles), Shetland Islands and Orkney Islands.

1708 to 1832 
 Orkney & Shetland
 Caithness (alternated with Bute)
 Sutherland
 Ross-shire
 Tain Burghs
 Cromartyshire (alternated with Nairnshire)
 Inverness-shire
 Inverness Burghs

1832 to 1885

1859 to 1885

1885 to 1918

*also the candidate of the Crofters' Party

1918 to 1950

1950 to 1983 

 (MacLeod, 1950) 

 (Stewart, 1970)

1983 to present

Grampian
Before 1974 comprising the counties of Elginshire, Nairnshire, Banffshire, Aberdeenshire and Kincardineshire.

After 1996 comprising the unitary authorities of Aberdeenshire, City of Aberdeen and Moray.

1708 to 1832 
 Banffshire
 Elginshire
 Elgin Burghs
 Nairnshire (alternated with Cromartyshire)
 Aberdeenshire
 Aberdeen Burghs
 Kincardineshire

1832 to 1885

1885 to 1918

1918 to 1983

1950 to 1983

1983 to present

Central and Tayside
Before 1974 comprising the counties of Forfarshire, Perthshire, Clackmannanshire, Kinross-shire and Stirlingshire.

After 1996 comprising the unitary authorities of Falkirk, Perth and Kinross, City of Dundee, Angus, Stirling and Clackmannanshire.

1708 to 1832 
 Forfarshire
 Perthshire
 Perth Burghs
 Clackmannanshire and Kinross-shire (alternated)
 Stirlingshire
 Stirling Burghs

1832 to 1885

1885 to 1918

1918 to 1950

1950 to 1983

1983 to present

Fife

1708 to 1832 
 Fife
 Anstruther Easter Burghs
 Dysart Burghs

1832 to 1885

1885 to 1918

1918 to 1974

1974 to present

Strathclyde
Before 1974 comprising the counties of Argyllshire, Buteshire, Dunbartonshire, Renfrewshire, Ayrshire and Lanarkshire.

After 1996 comprising the unitary authorities of City of Glasgow, North Lanarkshire, South Lanarkshire, Renfrewshire, North Ayrshire, East Ayrshire, South Ayrshire, East Dunbartonshire, East Renfrewshire, West Dunbartonshire, Argyll and Bute and Inverclyde.

1708 to 1832 
 Argyllshire
 Bute (alternated with Caithness)
 Dunbartonshire
 Renfrewshire
 Ayrshire
 Ayr Burghs
 Lanarkshire
 Glasgow Burghs

1832 to 1885

1885 to 1918

1918 to 1950

1950 to 1983

1983 to 2005

2005 to present

Lothian 
Before 1974 comprising the counties of Linlithgowshire, Edinburghshire and Haddingtonshire.

After 1996 comprising the unitary authorities of City of Edinburgh, West Lothian, East Lothian and Midlothian.

1708 to 1832 
 Linlithgowshire
 Linlithgow Burghs
 Edinburghshire
 Edinburgh
 Haddingtonshire
 Haddington Burghs

1832 to 1885

1885 to 1918

1918 to 1974

1950 to 1983

1983 to present

Dumfries and Galloway and Borders
Before 1974 comprising the counties of Dumfriesshire, Kirkcudbrightshire, Wigtownshire, Peeblesshire, Selkirkshire, Roxburghshire and Berwickshire.

After 1996 comprising the unitary authorities of Dumfries and Galloway and Scottish Borders.

1708 to 1832 
 Dumfriesshire
 Dumfries Burghs
 Wigtownshire
 Wigtown Burghs
 Kirkcudbrightshire
 Peebleshire
 Selkirkshire
 Roxburghshire
 Berwickshire

1832 to 1885

1885 to 1918

1918 to 1950

1950 to 1983

1983 to present

Non-geographic (2)

Sources
British Historical Facts 1760-1830 by Chris Cook and John Stevenson
British Parliamentary Election Results 1832-1983, (5 volumes) edited by F.W.S. Craig

See also
List of constituencies in the Parliament of Scotland at the time of the Union

 
  
 
Great Britain and UK Parliament constituencies in Scotland from 1707
Constituencies in Scotland from 1707